Congaz is a commune and village in the Gagauz Autonomous Territorial Unit of the Republic of Moldova.  The 2004 census listed the commune as having a population of 12,327 people.   Gagauz total 11,849. Minorities included 149 Moldovans, 128 Russians, 91 Ukrainians, and 62 Bulgarians.

Its geographical coordinates are 46° 6' 33" North, 28° 36' 16" East.

Notable people
People from Congaz include these individuals:
 Mihail Kendighelean
 Stepan Esir
Todur Zanet

References

Congaz